WJMC (1240 kHz) is an AM radio station broadcasting a full-service format of middle of the road music, news, and talk. Licensed to Rice Lake, Wisconsin, United States, the station serves the Rice Lake-Spooner area.  The station is currently owned by TKC, Inc. and features programming from Premiere Networks.

References

External links
FCC History Cards for WJMC

JMC
Adult standards radio stations in the United States
Radio stations established in 1971